Miss Russia 2017 was the 25th Miss Russia pageant, and was held in the concert hall Barvikha Luxury Village in Moscow on 15 April 2017. Fifty contestants from around Russia competed for the crown. Yana Dobrovolskaya of Tyumen crowned her successor Polina Popova of Sverdlovsk Oblast at the end of the event. The pageant was hosted by Miss Russia 2003 Victoria Lopyreva and Maxim Privalov, and featured guest performances from Elka, Stas Piekha, Nyusha, Ani Lorak, and Dmitry Malikov.

Results

Placements

Contestants

Judges 
Lyasan Utiasheva – Television presenter and former rhythmic gymnast
Jonathan Becker – Photographer
Sofia Nikitchuk – Actress and Miss Russia 2015
Arkadiy Novikov – Restaurateur 
Oxana Fedorova – Miss Russia 2001 and Miss Universe 2002 
Ksenia Sukhinova – Miss Russia 2007 and Miss World 2008

References

External links

2017 beauty pageants
2017 in Moscow
April 2017 events in Europe
April 2017 events in Russia
Miss Russia